Full may refer to:
 People with the surname Full, including:
 Mr. Full (given name unknown), acting Governor of German Cameroon, 1913 to 1914
 A property in the mathematical field of topology; see Full set
 A property of functors in the mathematical field of category theory; see Full and faithful functors
 Satiety, the absence of hunger
 A standard bed size, see Bed
 Fulling, also known as tucking or walking ("waulking" in Scotland), term for a step in woollen clothmaking (verb: to full)
 Full-Reuenthal, a municipality in the district of Zurzach in the canton of Aargau in Switzerland

See also
"Fullest", a song by the rapper Cupcakke
Ful (disambiguation)